WQLB (103.3 FM Tawas City, Michigan) and WKJZ (94.9 FM Hillman, Michigan, serving the Alpena market) are a pair of radio stations known as "HITS FM". The station plays classic hits from the 1970s through the 1990s. It had broadcast a classic rock format ("B-Rock," partially satellite-fed from Jones Radio Networks) until May 2007 when it switched to its current classic hits format. Prior to "B-Rock," WKJZ 94.9 had been a simulcast of country sister station 104.7 WKJC.

Deb Michaels is the Hits FM weekday morning show host; the station is mainly locally automated outside of her show.

Sources
Michiguide.com - WQLB History
Michiguide.com - WKJZ History

External links

Qlb
Classic hits radio stations in the United States
Radio stations established in 1997